Hancockius augur is a species of tephritid or fruit flies in the genus Hancockius of the family Tephritidae.

References

Tephritinae